

Damianus (or Damian) served as Bishop of Rochester from his consecration between 655 and 664 until his death about 664. He was consecrated by Deusdedit, the Archbishop of Canterbury.

Citations

References

External links
 

Bishops of Rochester
7th-century English bishops